The 2017 season is Ilocos United's 1st season in the top flight of Philippines football.  The club is managed by an Ilocos-based group, consisting of Filipino-Australian promoter Jarred Kelly and English businessman Tony Lazaro.

The club only managed to secure a single league match victory and placed last in the league table. They withdrew from the league after the season.

Competitions

Philippines Football League

Regular season

Note:
 a The home stadium of the club is located in Bantay, Ilocos Sur, a nearby town of Vigan. For administrative and marketing purposes, the home city of Ilocos United is designated as "Vigan"
 b Because of the ongoing works in the Marikina Sports Complex, the team will play its first few league games at the Biñan Football Stadium and Rizal Memorial Stadium and will have to groundshare with Stallion Laguna and Meralco Manila, respectively.

Squad

First-team squad

Foreign players
In the Philippines Football League, there can be at least four non-Filipino nationals in a team as long as they are registered. Foreign players who have acquired permanent residency can be registered as locals.

 Baba Sampana
 Arthur Kouassi
 Adam Mitter
 Andrew Pawiak

References

Ilocos United 2017
Ilocos United 2017